Miss Supranational 2023 will be the 14th edition of the Miss Supranational pageant. Lalela Mswane of South Africa will crown her successor at the end of the event.

Background 
Starting from 2023, the Miss Supranational Organization have decided to accept women from ages of 18 to 32 years old to participate in the pageant.

Pre-finals virtual activities

Introductions
This year's confirmed delegates were introduced monthly via Miss Supranational social media platforms.

In February 2023, the first group appearances were delegates from India, Dominican Republic, Iceland, Belgium, Lesotho, Canada, Gibraltar, Venezuela, Turkiye, Togo,  Romania, Portugal, Nigeira and Nicaragua who share aspirational and inspirational facts about themselves and share their understanding of pageantry.

Delegates from Brazil, Malaysia, Poland, Mozambique, Peru, Japan, Chile, Panama and Haiti were introduced in March 2023.

Contestants
As of 19 March 2023, 38 contestants have been confirmed:

Upcoming pageants

Notes

Debuts

Returns

Last competed in 2013:
 

Last competed in 2017:
 

Last competed in 2018:
 

Last competed in 2019:
 
 

Last competed in 2021:

References

External links
 

2023
2023 beauty pageants